Pentila nigeriana, the Nigerian red pentila, is a butterfly in the family Lycaenidae. It is found in southern Nigeria. The habitat consists of forests.

References

Butterflies described in 1961
Poritiinae
Endemic fauna of Nigeria
Butterflies of Africa